Javier Salmeron is a paralympic athlete from Spain competing mainly in category C8 400m events.

Javier competed in both the 1988 and 1992 Summer Paralympics as part of the Spanish athletics team.  At the 1988 games he finished eighth in the 100m but won a bronze in the 800m.  In the 1992 games he was unable to repeat this feat in the 800m as he failed to make the final, he did however finish sixth in the 200m, fourth in the 100m and won a silver medal in the 400m behind Canada's Frank Bruno who set a new world record, he was also part of the Spanish team that finished second in the 4 × 100 m behind the United States.

References

External links
 

Paralympic athletes of Spain
Athletes (track and field) at the 1988 Summer Paralympics
Athletes (track and field) at the 1992 Summer Paralympics
Paralympic silver medalists for Spain
Paralympic bronze medalists for Spain
Spanish male sprinters
Spanish male middle-distance runners
Living people
Year of birth missing (living people)
Medalists at the 1988 Summer Paralympics
Medalists at the 1992 Summer Paralympics
Paralympic medalists in athletics (track and field)
20th-century Spanish people